Ahsan Ali Taj is a Pakistani music composer, songwriter and singer. He started his music career in 2001 as a singer and music composer. Ahsan is well known to create a distinctive pattern of music sustaining the Pakistani Music values. He inherited musical instincts from his parents, his father was a classical, semi classical & Saraiki folk singer and his mother Nighat Seema, famous singer of 60s, 70s and onwards. His early training and musical understanding was initially developed by his parents but after sudden death of his mother this coaching stopped and he started his journey with some well-known professionals such as Music Director Niaz Ahmed Khan,< Producer Nizaar Lalani, Waqar Ali, Director & Executive Producer Ameer Imam and loads of more.

Career
Keeping the family tradition enduring Ahsan kept seeking for innovative opportunities to prove his skills and melodic expertise, with a diverse exposure of post-production he has always believed in his creativity and hard work. His Projects furnishing his Music Director figure were Kya Haath Laga Pathar Ban Kar. An OST that was as great success that was sung by Sanam Marvi, Lyrics were written by Tariq Jameel, telecasted at GEO TV. Drama Serial Hazaron Saal, Directed by Hisham Syed was composed musically by Ahsan, similarly Sirf Larki Nahi Men Mahi Munda Bhi Hoon (OST) was also composed by him and aired at GEO TV, sung by Singer, Khusboo (Indian Vocalist), and Lyrics were by Ayub Khawar, this was Drama Serial Shaddan, Directed by Naved Jafri.

Contributions
His one great achievement also consist of the Drama Serial "Saat Pardon Men", Directed by Yasir Nawaz, aired at GEO TV.

Discography

References

Pakistani male singers
Pakistani keyboardists
Living people
Pakistani pop singers
Pakistani composers
Pakistani male television actors
Musicians from Karachi
Male actors from Karachi
Pakistani playback singers
Pakistani people of Bengali descent
Pakistani television directors
Pakistani television producers
1980 births